Cerithiopsilla georgiana is a species of  very small sea snails, marine gastropod molluscs in the family Cerithiopsidae. It was described by Pfeffer in 1886.

Description 
The maximum recorded shell length is 5 mm.

Habitat 
Minimum recorded depth is 1 m. Maximum recorded depth is 1 m.

References

External links

Cerithiopsidae
Gastropods described in 1886